Conus pseudonivifer is a species of sea snail, a marine gastropod mollusk in the family Conidae, the cone snails and their allies.

Like all species within the genus Conus, these snails are predatory and venomous. They are capable of "stinging" humans, therefore live ones should be handled carefully or not at all.

Description
The size of the shell varies between 24 mm and 50 mm.

It is a white shell. Its color forms of some spots and spot like features as well as interior and exterior parts ranges from light brown and butterscotch to brown to chocolate and chestnut brown.

Distribution
This species occurs in the Atlantic Ocean off the Cape Verdes.

References

 Tucker J.K. & Tenorio M.J. (2009) Systematic classification of Recent and fossil conoidean gastropods. Hackenheim: Conchbooks. 296 pp.
 Puillandre N., Duda T.F., Meyer C., Olivera B.M. & Bouchet P. (2015). One, four or 100 genera? A new classification of the cone snails. Journal of Molluscan Studies. 81: 1–23

Gallery
Below are several color forms:

External links
 The Conus Biodiversity website
 Cone Shells - Knights of the Sea
 

pseudonivifer
Gastropods of Cape Verde
Gastropods described in 2004